1st Reserve Division() was formed in August 1955 in Chengdu Military Region. On February 15, 1956, the division moved to Jiajiang, Sichuan.

As of its activation the division was composed of:
1st Reserve Regiment;
2nd Reserve Regiment;
3rd Reserve Regiment;
Artillery Regiment;
Anti-Aircraft Artillery Regiment;
Sergeant Training Regiment.

The division was fully manned and equipped. During its short-lived existence the division was focused on the training of officers and sergeants.

In March 1958 the division was demobilized, moving to Heilongjiang for agricultural missions.

References

《四川省志·军事志》，p. 85

R1
Military units and formations established in 1955
Military units and formations disestablished in 1958
Reserve divisions of the People's Liberation Army